Yaseenabad or Yasinabad  is a neighbourhood in the Karachi Central district of Karachi, Pakistan.

See also 
 Aisha Manzil
 Ancholi
 Azizabad
 Karimabad
 Shafiq Mill Colony
 Naseerabad
 Water Pump
 Gulberg Town
 Musa Colony
 Dastagir Colony

References

External links 
 Karachi website

Neighbourhoods of Karachi
Gulberg Town, Karachi
Karachi Central District